KUHD-LD, UHF channel 44 UHF Virtual channel 51), is a low powered HSN-affiliated television station licensed to Ventura, California, United States. The station is owned by Obidia Porras.

Previously the station, as KUHD-LP, broadcast an analog signal on channel 6, which allowed its audio to be received at 87.7 MHz on FM radios. This is colloquially known as a "Franken-FM". However, as of February 2021 KUHD-LP was no longer broadcasting on 87.7 FM.

The station was issued a construction permit to move its city of license to Camarillo, with a new transmitter on UHF channel 44. This included a switch to a digital signal and a call letter change to KUHD-LD.

References

External links

UHD-LD
Television channels and stations established in 1992
1992 establishments in California
Low-power television stations in the United States